Sloane Crosley (born August 3, 1979) is an American writer living in New York City known for her humorous essays, including the collections I Was Told There'd Be Cake, How Did You Get This Number, and Look Alive Out There. She has also worked as a publicist at the Vintage Books division of Random House and as an adjunct professor in Columbia University's Master of Fine Arts program. She graduated from Connecticut College in 2000.

Career
Riverhead Books published Crosley's first collection of essays I Was Told There'd Be Cake on April 1, 2008. The book became a New York Times bestseller. It was a finalist for the Thurber Prize for American Humor, one of Amazon's best books of the year, and optioned by HBO. Crosley's second collection of essays, the 2010 book How Did You Get This Number, also became a New York Times bestseller. Farrar, Straus and Giroux released her debut novel The Clasp in October 2015; it was optioned by Universal Pictures in 2016. Her third book of essays Look Alive Out There was also a Thurber Prize finalist. Farrar, Straus and Giroux published Cult Classic by Crosley in 2022. In addition to her own books, Crosley edited The Best American Travel Writing in 2011.

Crosley has published work in or edited for various magazines and newspapers. She was a weekly columnist for British newspaper The Independent in 2011. She is a contributing editor at Vanity Fair and was the founding columnist for The New York Times "Townies" op-ed series, a columnist for The New York Observer Diary, a columnist for The Village Voice, a contributing editor at BlackBook Magazine and is a regular contributor to The New York Times, GQ, Elle, and NPR. She has also written cover stories and features for Salon, Spin, Vogue, Esquire, Playboy, W Magazine, and AFAR. She co-wrote the song "It Only Gets Much Worse" with Nate Ruess.

Crosley is co-chair of The New York Public Library's Young Lions Committee and serves on the board of Housingworks Bookstore.

In popular culture
In 2011 Crosley appeared on the TV series Gossip Girl as herself. She appeared on The Late Late Show with Craig Ferguson on six occasions from 2010 to 2014. 

She was mentioned in BoJack Horseman when the character Diane Nguyen receives an advance for a book of personal essays. On July 4, 2022, she was a clue on Jeopardy.

Bibliography

Story and essay collections

Novels
 
 Cult Classic. Farrar, Straus and Giroux MCD. 2022.

References

1979 births
Living people
American women novelists
Connecticut College alumni
American women essayists
American women columnists
The Independent people
The New York Times columnists
The New York Observer people
The Village Voice people
21st-century American novelists
21st-century American women writers
Columbia University faculty
21st-century American essayists
Novelists from New York (state)
American women academics
Vanity Fair (magazine) people